Sherryl Jordan (born 8 June 1949) is a New Zealand writer for children and young adults, specialising in fantasy and historical fiction. She has written a number of children's and young adult works published in New Zealand and overseas. She is best known for her books The Juniper Game and The Raging Quiet. She received the Margaret Mahy Medal for her contribution to children's literature, publishing and literacy in 2001.

Biography
Jordan was born on 8 June 1949 in Hawera, New Zealand, and grew up in Normanby, near Mount Taranaki. Her adult life has been spent in Tauranga. Her early work in children's literature was as an illustrator, and she has written picture books, middle grade fiction, and young adult fiction. Her knowledge of sign language and her experience working as a teacher aide with deaf children is a clear influence on her historical fiction, The Raging Quiet.

Bibliography
Jordan's books have been published by a range of publishers internationally.
 1981 The Silent One (Illustrations – text by Joy Cowley)
 1983 Mouse (Illustrations)
 1985 Mouse Monster (Illustrations)
 1984 The Firewind and the Song
 1985 Matthew's Monster 
 1986 Matthew's Monsters  
 1988 No Problem Pomperoy!
 1989 Kittens
 1989 The Wobbly Tooth 
 1990 Rocco (published in the USA as A Time of Darkness)  
 1990 Babysitter Bear
 1991 The Juniper Game
 1991 The Wednesday Wizard (Denzil series, book one)
 1992 Denzil's Dilemma (Denzil series, book two) (published in the US as Wizard for a Day)
 1993 The Other side of Midnight
 1993 Winter of Fire
 1994 Tanith
 1994 Wolf-Woman
 1995 Sign of the Lion
 1996 Secret Sacrament
 1997 Denzil's Great Bear Burglary (Denzil series, book three)
 1999 The Raging Quiet  
 2002 The Hunting of the Last Dragon
 2007 The Silver Dragon (Denzil series, book four)
 2007 Time of the Eagle
 2010 Finnigan and the Pirates
 2012 Ransomwood 
 2013 The Freedom Merchants
2018 The Raging Quiet
2018 Ratbag
2018 The Anger of Angels
2021 The King's Nightingale

Awards
Jordan has won a number of prestigious awards. Her books have been shortlisted for awards in New Zealand, the UK, the USA, Belgium and Germany.
 1981 Whitcoulls national illustrating competition for The Silent One 
 1982 AIM Children's Book Awards Book of the Year for The Silent One
 1988 Choysa Bursary Award for Rocco 
 1991 AIM Children's Book Awards Fiction Winner for Rocco 
 1992 Esther Glen Awards shortlist for The Juniper Game 
 1992 Esther Glen Awards shortlist for The Wednesday Wizard
 1992 AIM Children's Book Awards Fiction shortlist for The Wednesday Wizard 
 1992 AIM Children's Book Awards Fiction shortlist for The Juniper Game 
 1993 AIM Children's Book Awards Junior Fiction shortlist for Denzil's Dilemma 
 1993 Iowa University (USA): Won a writing residency for the International Writing Programme 
 1993 American bookseller magazine "Pick of the List" for Winter of Fire  
 1994 AIM Children's Book Awards Senior Fiction shortlist for Winter of Fire 
 1994 American Library Association Best Book for Young Adults for Winter of Fire 
 1994 Children's Book of the Year by Bank Street School of Education (USA) for Winter of Fire  
 1995 AIM Children's Book Awards Senior Fiction shortlist for Tanith 
 1995 Esther Glen Awards shortlist for Tanith 
 1995 American Library Association Best Book for Young Adults for Tanith (Wolf-Woman)  
 1995 Voted one of the "Young Adults" choices (USA) for Winter of Fire 
 1999 The USA School Library Journal Best of Award for The Raging Quiet 
 2000 Storylines Notable Books List Senior Fiction list for The Raging Quiet 
 2001 Storylines Margaret Mahy Award
 2001 Wirral Paperpack of the Year for The Raging Quiet 
 2001 Buxtehude Bulle Prize for Best Young Person's Book of the Year for The Juniper Game 
 2002 IBBY Honour Book Writing for The Raging Quiet
 2005 Storylines Notable Books List – Young Adult Fiction list for The Hunting of the Last Dragon
 2008 Esther Glen Awards shortlist for Time of the Eagle
 2008 Storylines Notable Books List Young Adult Fiction list for Time of the Eagle
 2010 Storylines Gaelyn Gordon Award for Denzil's Dilemma
 2011 Storylines Notable Books List Junior Fiction list for Finnigan and the Pirates
 2011 New Zealand Post Children's Book Awards Junior Fiction winner for Finnigan and the Pirates
2021 New Zealand Post Children's Book Awards Young Adult Fiction shortlist for The King's Nightingale

References

External links 

 Sherryl Jordan at Read NZ
 
 

New Zealand women children's writers
People from Hāwera
People from Tauranga
1949 births
New Zealand fantasy writers
20th-century New Zealand people
New Zealand children's writers
Living people